"I'm Not That Lonely Yet" is a song written by Bill Rice and Sharon Vaughn, and recorded by American country music artist Reba McEntire.  It was released in June 1982 as the first single from the album Unlimited.  The song reached #3 on the Billboard Hot Country Singles & Tracks chart for the week of September 4, 1982.

Charts

Weekly charts

Year-end charts

References

1982 singles
1982 songs
Reba McEntire songs
Songs written by Bill Rice
Songs written by Sharon Vaughn
Song recordings produced by Jerry Kennedy
Mercury Records singles